Michael Louden (April 21, 1964 – September 4, 2004) was an American actor.

Career
Louden was born in Marblehead, Massachusetts and went on to become an actor. He studied theater at the University of North Carolina at Chapel Hill but graduated from Juilliard. He started as a 1988-day player on daytime soap Another World but his most notable role was Duke Kramer on As the World Turns. Duke was a moody young man who discovered his father was the volatile John Dixon (allowing Louden many scenes with theater powerhouse Larry Bryggman). Duke went on to medical school as well as a lengthy relationship with Lien Hughes, played by future ER star Ming-Na Wen. Louden played the role from 1988 to 1990 and for a brief visit in 1993.

Louden had a small part on One Life to Live in 1995 as a court reporter. Among the handful of his other film and TV appearances was a role in the 2000 film Space Cowboys. In 2003 he briefly hosted the video game show Arena on the G4 network. 
In Hellbent in 2004, he was a cop-loving drag queen.
While working at G4, Michael became very involved with the Black Rabbit Society.

He continued to work in theater and independent film until his sudden death from a brain aneurysm.

Filmography

References

External links

American male soap opera actors
1964 births
2004 deaths
People from Marblehead, Massachusetts
Place of death missing
20th-century American male actors